The Naval Service Act was a statute of the Parliament of Canada, enacted in 1910.  The Act was put forward by the Liberal government of Prime Minister Sir Wilfrid Laurier to establish a Canadian navy. Prior to the passage of the Act, Canada did not have a navy of its own, being dependent on the British Royal Navy for maritime defence. The Act intended to provide Canada with a separate naval force, but one that, if needed, could be placed under British control during a time of war. French-Canadian nationalists and British-Canadian imperialists both opposed the Act, although for different reasons.  The controversy of the naval question eventually contributed to the defeat of Laurier's government in the federal election of 1911. The new Conservative government, led by Prime Minister Sir Robert Borden, instead proposed building three battleships or cruisers, to be put at the service of the British Navy.

After the passage of the Naval Service Act, the Naval Service was established on May 4, 1910. the initiation of this act was a direct response to the naval arms race that was happening between Britain and Germany. Also, Britain supported this act because it was worried over the expansion of the German Navy. By the end of 1910, the Naval Service's first vessels were inaugurated, two former British Royal Navy vessels. The act also established the Naval Reserve and the Naval College. The Naval Service became known as the Royal Canadian Navy in 1911.

The Naval Service Act remained in force, with amendments and modifications, until being repealed and replaced by the National Defence Act in 1950.

Background

After the Canadian Confederation, naval army was a priority to the Dominion of Canada. Many naval battles happened in the Canadian waters such as between the British and French ships. Also, during the war between the British and Americans ships, Canadian waters were distributed. This indicates that The Dominion of Canada must be able to defend it self if a sea battle occur near its shores, which made it a priority in that time. The navy force began to be needed in the 1880s with fisheries disputes with the Americans. Britain had its own political concerns and did not want to be involved with protecting Canadian shores after the Canadian Confederation. Also, Britain did not want to anger the U.S. and break the relationship with them. As a result, Britain withdrew their military troops and left some ships to protect their interest in Halifax. Canada was left to no other choice but to create their own navy for protection against The U.S.

Britain's fear that Germany's navy would catch up to its Royal Navy has been coined as the ‘Dreadnought' crisis.  At the 1909 Imperial Conference, British officials requested help from the Dominion prime ministers, concerning its navy.  This request imposed upon Prime Minister Sir Wilfrid Laurier what became known as his ‘naval question'.

Bill

Introduction of the bill
The proposal of the Naval Bill was for a naval force of 11 ships costing $3 million annually. As a result, the House of Commons was split. some of them preferred to contribute the money to the Royal Navy (Britain government) for them to benefit from the money and create more ships. Others favoured having a separate Canadian navy in order for better protection and to not depend on  other countries for protection. It was important to initiate a Canadian naval force in order change the picture of Canada and can defend it self against predators. However, the Naval Service Bill passed on the third reading in the House of Commons.

Laurier's compromise

Laurier's compromise was the Naval Service Act, which was introduced in January 1910.  It set up the Department of Naval Services, which would operate a small Canadian Navy. Canada's navy was to be controlled by Ottawa, but during times of war it could be put under British control. Under this new act, Canada was to construct a naval college that was capable of training Canadian naval officers.  This Naval College was constructed in 1910 in the city of Halifax, Nova Scotia.  It also proposed under the act that Canada would order the construction of five cruisers and six destroyers in order to create its own navy.

Opposition 

Within Canada itself, the Naval Service Act was very controversial.  The act was strongly criticized by both French Canadian nationalists and English Canadians. Imperialistic-minded Canadians claimed that Canada was doing too little or was not showing enough loyalty to Britain.  Conservatives famously dubbed Laurier's new policy as the “Tin Pot Navy”.  The act was highly criticized by French Canadian Nationalists, led by Henri Bourassa. Bourassa felt that the establishment of a Canadian navy that could be placed under British control was even worse than transferring cash to the British Admiralty, and that Canada risked being dragged into every British war.  In addition, the French-Canadian nationalists were concerned that the navy would mean conscription for the Canadian people.

Robert Borden's Conservatives and Henri Bourassa's Quebec nationalists were against the Naval Bill. This is because many Conservatives claimed that the money would be spent on the Canadian Navy could go as a direct cash contribution to the British government. This would help by constructing more ships for the British government which will increase the defence rate to the Canadian shores. On the other hand, Bourassa argued that the initiation of a Canadian navy would serve better for British interests but not Canada's and on the expense of the Canadian power and money.

British reaction

While the British Admiralty was disappointed that Canada's assistance was to come in the form of its own naval force instead of funding British dreadnoughts, they were willing to accept any form of assistance as opposed to none at all. To this end, the British authorized the transfer of two old cruisers to Canada.  Canada's first naval ship arrived on October 17, 1910; it was the former Royal Navy cruiser HMCS Niobe. On November 7, the second ship HMCS Rainbow, which was also a former Royal Navy cruiser, arrived in British Columbia. These two cruisers were used mainly for training purposes.

Aftermath

The loss of French-Canadian support for Laurier's Liberals played a key role in his party's defeat in the 1911 election. He was replaced by the Conservatives, led by Robert Borden.  In 1913, Borden replaced the Naval Service Act with the Naval Aid Bill, under which, instead of building or supplying ships, Canada would give the British Royal Navy cash instead. The Naval Aid Bill was defeated by the Liberal-dominated Senate of Canada.

With the outbreak of World War I in 1914, Canada found itself automatically at war with the Central Powers and the question of naval assistance quickly became a moot point.  Any ships would have been built in British shipyards and with the onset of war, Britain was building all that it could.  Canada thus became focused upon its own war effort.

Even without a Canadian contribution, the Royal Navy remained significantly larger and more powerful than their German opponent. Even before the outbreak of war, Germany had essentially abandoned its effort to match the Royal Navy and redirected the bulk of its resources to strengthening the army. The strength of the British navy, combined with the strength of the French Navy and later bolstered by the entry of Italy and the United States on the Allied side, ensured that Allied control of the Atlantic sea lanes was never seriously threatened and compelled Germany to pursue less costly alternatives, submarines, in particular, to project a measure of power on the high seas.

In the Pacific, British and Canadian interests were assisted by having Japan as an ally. During World War I, the Imperial Japanese Navy had a North American Task Force.

Revision and repeal
The Naval Service Act remained in force under the Conservative government and after the conclusion of World War I.  A new, revised version of the Act was enacted in 1944, during World War II.  The Act was subsequently repealed by the National Defence Act, enacted in 1950, which brought all of the Canadian armed forces under one statute.

See also
 100th Anniversary of the Canadian Navy, memorial in Victoria, British Columbia
 History of the Royal Canadian Navy
 Origins of the Royal Canadian Navy

References

Sources

Berger, Carl “Imperialism and Nationalism, 1884-1914: A Conflict in Canadian Thought” R. Douglas Francis and Donald B. Smith Readings in Canadian History Toronto: Nelson/Thompson 2006
Bercusion, David J. and J. L Granastein The Collins Dictionary of Canadian History Toronto: Collins 1988
Bercusion, David J. and J. L Granastein, Dictionary of Canadian Military History, Toronto: Oxford University Press, 1992
Francis, R. Douglas, Richard Jones and Donald B. Smith, Destinies: Canadian History Since Confederation, Scarborough Ontario: Nelson/Thompson 2004
Gough, Barry M. Historical Dictionary of Canada, London: Scarecrow Press, 1999
Hill, Brian, Canada A Chronology and Fact Book, New York, Oceana 1973
Myers, Jay, Canadian Fact and Dates, Markham Ontario: Fitzhenrt and Whiteside, 1986

External links
 Text of Act

1910 in Canadian law
Canadian federal legislation
Military history of Canada